The 1975 Northwest Territories general election was on March 10, 1975. This was the first general election since 1902 that all the members of the assembly were elected. Fifteen members were elected to the Legislative Council.

Election summary

Members of the Legislative Assembly elected
For complete electoral history, see individual districts

References

1975 elections in Canada
Elections in the Northwest Territories
March 1975 events in Canada
1975 in the Northwest Territories